Jane Kendall Mason (1909 - 1981) was an American debutante, socialite, and outdoorswoman.

Biography 
Mason was born Jane Welsh in 1909. A decade later, her mother Elizabeth, a divorcée who sang at private parties for members of New York City's upper class, began a relationship with the divorced Wall Street tycoon Lyman Kendall, who was worth an estimated $20 million. Kendall and her mother married, and he legally adopted Mason. The family moved to Tuxedo Park, New York and maintained residences in Miami and Washington, D.C., and sailed to Europe for extended stays.

Mason was educated at exclusive private schools, where she showed promise in drawing and sculpture, and competed as an equestrian at Madison Square Garden. In her teenage years, the family lived at Kentsdale, an 1,000 acre estate near Potomac, Maryland, and were members of the Congressional Country Club.

When she was seventeen years old, she was presented as a debutante at two different balls in Washington, D.C.

In 1927, at the age of eighteen, she married George Grant Mason, Jr. in an elaborate society wedding at her family's estate. Mason, a graduate of Yale University, was from a wealthy family and served as head of Pan-American Airways' Caribbean operations in Cuba. The Masons moved to Jaimanitas, a large estate west of Havana that was staffed by nine servants. It was here that Mason became known as a glamorous and eccentric socialite, hosting parties and attending events at clubs, casinos, and horse races.

In September 1931 Mason and her husband were introduced to Ernest Hemingway and his wife, Pauline Pfeiffer, while sailing on the SS Île de France.

Former U.S. First Lady Grace Coolidge referred to Mason as "the most beautiful debutante who ever entered the White House." American portraitist Howard Chandler Christy called her "one of the very best types of American girl." Ernest Hemingway, with whom she was close friends and occasionally romantically involved, referred to her as "about the most uninhibited person I ever met." She and Hemingway began an affair in 1932.

In 1932, she wrote an article titled Resorting to Havana for Vogue.

Mason, who could not conceive children, adopted to British boys, and Hemingway was named the godfather of the elder son. On a safari with Bror Blixen, Mason shot a zebra foul and had it made into a rocking horse for her children. She was an avid sportswoman and big game hunter, shooting elephants and rhinoceroses, and also went on big game fishing excursions.

Hemingway based the characters Richard Bradley and Helène Bradley in To Have and Have Not on the Masons. He also based the character Margot Macomber in The Short Happy Life of Francis Macomber on Mason.

She modelled in advertisements for Pond's cold cream.

In 1940 she divorced her first husband, George Grant Mason, Jr., who was a member of the Civil Aeronautics Board in Tampa, Florida. A month later she married Republican politician and lawyer John Daniel Miller Hamilton, two days after he resigned as executive director of the Republican National Committee. This marriage ended after she had an affair with the editor of Reader's Digest. Then she married Arnold Gingrich in 1955, who she had previously been involved with while also being involved with Hemingway. She and Gingrich lived at different residences in New York before settling in Ridgewood, New Jersey in 1962.

In 1964 she suffered a stroke that left her semi-invalid for the rest of her life. After the stroke, M.F.K. Fisher described her in a 1968 letter as "a hopeless and completely helpless paralytic and ex-alcoholic cared for like a rare orchid." Fisher and Mason's husband engaged in an affair at that time.

She survived a suicide attempt in 1933, jumping off the balcony at her Cuban residence, and underwent months of intensive psychotherapy.

In 1935, while on safari in East Africa, she had a romantic dalliance with Colonel Richard Cooper, a British officer who owned a coffee plantation in Tanganyika.

She died in 1981.

References 

1909 births
1981 deaths
American debutantes
American hunters
American socialites
American sportswomen
Mistresses